Colchester is a community and unincorporated place in Southwestern Ontario, the southernmost settlement on mainland Canada, and the southernmost point with the exception of Point Pelee National Park. Colchester was formerly part of the Township of Colchester South and is now a part of the amalgamated Town of Essex within the County of Essex. Colchester shares its postal code with Harrow as N0R 1G0.

Europeans began to settle in Colchester in the 18th century. Many United Empire Loyalists leaving the United States around the time of the American Revolutionary War were given land grants in Colchester. Some of names of these pioneers can still be found today in the names of residents throughout the region including: Snider, Huffman, Ferris, Hutchins, Iler, McCormick, Quick, and Tofflemire. One such Loyalist was John Snider of Pennsylvania. In 1798 Snider was given Lot 82 along the lakefront and built a home for his family just west of the village. As the oldest known structure along Lake Erie's shoreline, the house was completed in 1813 and a letter from the time indicates that men were working on the home's roof as cannons roared during the Battle of Lake Erie.

The area was also a destination for slaves escaping the U.S. via the Underground Railroad in the mid-19th century, and for freed slaves during and after the American Civil War. In the 1870s a church was built along Dunn Road by many pioneering blacks, and it was named Zion African Methodist Episcopal (AME) Church. The church's cemetery still stands today on the western edge of the Road. Colchester was also the birthplace and hometown of railroad engineer and inventor Elijah McCoy, whose work was granted 45 patents in the US.

Today, in addition to its many lakeside cottages, Colchester is home to several hundred year-round residents who have converted older homes and built new ones. Restaurants, a public beach, and a marina have been an important part of Colchester for some years now. The population is approximately 900.

Colchester lies along the southernmost road on mainland Canada, County Road 50, and has recently become a tourist destination because of the nearby wineries, the beach and harbour, and the scenery of the area. Every year, the village plays host to the "Colchester Villagefest" and "Explore the Shore", which are aimed at attracting visitors to the venues and attractions along the historic lakefront road. The village is also home to Christ Church Colchester (Anglican) which has a long history dating back to the beginnings of Colchester as a settlement.

References

Communities in Essex County, Ontario
Populated places on the Underground Railroad